Ben David Martin (born 15 November 1982) is an English professional footballer who last played as a defender for Royston Town.

Career
Martin initially began his career playing youth football at Barton Rovers. Martin began his senior career at hometown club Harpenden Town, before signing for Aylesbury United in 2003.

In 2003, Martin signed for Swindon Town, following a successful trial. On 15 October 2003, Martin made his first and only appearance for Swindon, playing as a centre forward in a 2–1 defeat in the Football League Trophy against Boston United. At the end of October 2003, Martin was loaned out to Lincoln City for a month, before joining Farnborough Town on loan in 2004.

Following his release from Swindon, Martin joined St Albans City. Over the course of five years at the club, Martin made 99 appearances for St Albans in the league, scoring ten times. Martin was also loaned out to Staines Town, Leighton Town, Wealdstone and Ashford Town during his spell at the club. In 2009, Martin joined Chelmsford City for a season, before returning to St Albans. In 2011, Martin signed for Welling United, making 74 league appearances, before re-signing for St Albans two years later. In the second half of the 2014–15 season, Martin signed for Boreham Wood, making eleven appearances as the club won promotion to the National League. Martin subsequently re-joined St Albans for a fourth spell after his time at Boreham Wood. During the second half of the 2016–17 season, Martin had brief spells with former clubs Barton Rovers and Welling. In 2018, Martin signed for Royston Town, making 13 appearances in all competitions, scoring once, before re-joining Harpenden Town for a two game stint. In 2019, Martin re-signed for Royston.

References

1982 births
Living people
People from Harpenden
Association football defenders
English footballers
Harpenden Town F.C. players
Aylesbury United F.C. players
Swindon Town F.C. players
Lincoln City F.C. players
Farnborough F.C. players
St Albans City F.C. players
Staines Town F.C. players
Leighton Town F.C. players
Wealdstone F.C. players
Ashford Town (Middlesex) F.C. players
Chelmsford City F.C. players
Welling United F.C. players
Boreham Wood F.C. players
Barton Rovers F.C. players
Royston Town F.C. players